Igor Diogo Moreira Araújo (born 4 February 1987) is a Portuguese professional footballer who plays for S.C. Covilhã as a goalkeeper.

Club career
Born in Leiria, Araújo spent his entire career with S.C. Covilhã after being developed at FC Porto. He played several seasons with the club in the Segunda Liga, mostly as a backup.

International career
Araújo was part of the Portugal squad at the 2007 FIFA U-20 World Cup, playing no matches in Canada.

See also
List of one-club men

References

External links
Covilhã official profile 

1987 births
Living people
People from Leiria
Sportspeople from Leiria District
Portuguese footballers
Association football goalkeepers
Liga Portugal 2 players
Segunda Divisão players
FC Porto players
Padroense F.C. players
S.C. Covilhã players
Portugal youth international footballers